The Progressive Conservative Party of Canada (PC) was a centre-right federal political party in Canada that existed from 1942 to 2003.

From Canadian Confederation in 1867 until 1942, the original Conservative Party of Canada participated in numerous governments and had multiple names. In 1942, its name was changed to the Progressive Conservative Party under the request of Manitoba Progressive Premier John Bracken. In the 1957 federal election, John Diefenbaker carried the Tories to their first victory in 27 years. The year after, he carried the PCs to the largest federal electoral landslide in history (in terms of proportion of seats). During his tenure, human rights initiatives were achieved, most notably the Bill of Rights. In the 1963 federal election, the PCs lost power. The PCs would not gain power again until 1979, when Joe Clark led the party to a minority government victory. However, the party lost power only nine months later. In 1983, Clark lost his leadership role to Brian Mulroney, who helped the PC Party gain popularity in Quebec. Mulroney won back-to-back majority governments in 1984 and 1988, and during his tenure, major economic reforms such as the North American Free Trade Agreement and the goods and services tax (GST) were introduced. 

The unpopularity of the GST, the government's failed attempts with the Meech Lake and Charlottetown accords, and the early 1990s recession, caused the party to become heavily unpopular, and thus collapse in the 1993 federal election, winning just two seats. Western Canadian PC support transferred to the more right-wing Reform Party, whereas PC support from Quebec transferred to the sovereigntist Bloc Québécois. Ultimately, the Progressive Conservatives did not recover in the subsequent 1997 and 2000 federal elections. When it became clear that neither the Progressive Conservatives nor the Reform Party/Canadian Alliance (the latter being the successor of the Reform Party) could defeat the incumbent Liberals that governed since the 1993 election, an effort to unite the right-of-centre parties emerged. In 2003, the party membership voted to dissolve the party and merge with the Canadian Alliance to form the modern-day Conservative Party of Canada.

History

Canada's first Prime Minister, Sir John A. Macdonald, belonged to the Liberal-Conservative Party.

The federal Tories governed Canada for over 40 of the country's first 70 years of existence. However, the party spent the majority of its history in opposition as the nation's number-two federal party, behind the Liberal Party of Canada. From 1896 to 1993, the Tories formed a government six times—from 1911 to 1921, briefly in 1926, from 1930 to 1935, from 1957 to 1963, from 1979 to 1980 and from 1984 to 1993.  It stands as the only Canadian party to have won more than 200 seats in an election—a feat it accomplished twice: in 1958 and 1984.

The party suffered a decade-long decline following the 1993 federal election and formally dissolved on December 7, 2003, when it merged with the Canadian Alliance to form the modern-day Conservative Party of Canada. The last meeting of the Progressive Conservative federal caucus was held in early 2004. The Conservative Party of Canada took power in 2006 and governed under the leadership of Stephen Harper until 2015, when it was defeated by the Liberal Party under Justin Trudeau.

Between the party's founding in 1867 and its adoption of the "Progressive Conservative" name in 1942, the party changed its name several times. It was most commonly known as the Conservative Party.

Several loosely associated provincial Progressive Conservative parties continue to exist in Manitoba, Ontario, New Brunswick, Nova Scotia, Prince Edward Island and Newfoundland and Labrador. As well, a small rump of Senators opposed the merger, and continued to sit in the Parliament of Canada as Progressive Conservatives. The last one of them rescinded their party status in 2016. The Yukon association of the party renamed itself as the Yukon Party in 1990. The British Columbia Progressive Conservative Party changed its name to the British Columbia Conservative Party in 1991. Saskatchewan's Progressive Conservative Party effectively ceased to exist in 1997, when the Saskatchewan Party formed – primarily from former PC Members of the Legislative Assembly (MLAs) with a few Saskatchewan Liberal MLAs joining them.

The party adopted the "Progressive Conservative" party name in 1942 when Manitoba Premier John Bracken, a long-time leader of that province's Progressive Party, agreed to become leader of the federal Conservatives on condition that the party add Progressive to its name. Despite the name change, most former Progressive supporters continued to support the Liberal Party of Canada or the Co-operative Commonwealth Federation, and Bracken's leadership of the Conservative Party came to an end in 1948. Many Canadians simply continued to refer to the party as "the Conservatives".

A major weakness of the party since 1885 was its inability to win support in Quebec, estranged significantly by that year's execution of Louis Riel. The Conscription Crisis of 1917 exacerbated the issue. Even though the Conservative Party of Quebec dominated politics in that province for the first 30 years of Confederation at both the federal and provincial levels, in the 20th century the party was never able to become a force in provincial politics, losing power in 1897, and dissolving in 1935 into the Union Nationale, which took power in 1936 under Maurice Duplessis.

In 20th-century federal politics, the Conservatives were often seen as insensitive to French-Canadian ambitions and interests and seldom succeeded in winning more than a handful of seats in Quebec, with a few notable exceptions:
 the 1930 federal election, in which Richard Bedford Bennett surprisingly led the party to a thin majority government victory by securing 24 seats in rural Quebec;
 the 1958 federal election, in which John Diefenbaker rode the backing of the right-leaning Union Nationale provincial government in Quebec to 50 of the province's 75 seats; and
 the federal elections of 1984 and 1988, when party leader Brian Mulroney, a fluently bilingual Quebecois, built an electoral coalition that included Quebec nationalists.

The party never fully recovered from the fragmentation of Mulroney's broad coalition in the late 1980s resulting in part from the failure of two provinces to ratify the Meech Lake Accord. Immediately prior to its merger with the Canadian Alliance, it held only 15 of 301 seats in the House of Commons of Canada. The party did not hold more than 20 seats in Parliament between 1993 and 2003.

The party pre-dates confederation in 1867, when it accepted many conservative-leaning former members of the Liberal Party into its ranks.  At confederation, the Liberal-Conservative Party of Canada became Canada's first governing party under Sir John A. Macdonald, and for years was either the governing party of Canada or the largest opposition party. The party changed its name to the Progressive Conservative Party of Canada following the election  as leader of Progressive Party of Manitoba Premier John Bracken in December 1942, who insisted on the name change as a condition of becoming leader.

Ideology

The Progressive Conservative Party was generally on the centre-right on the political spectrum. From 1867 on, the party was identified with Protestant and, in Quebec, Roman Catholic social values, British imperialism, Canadian nationalism, and constitutional centralism. This was highly successful until 1920, and to that point in history, the party was the most successful federal party in the Dominion.

As such, Canadian conservatism historically initially more closely resembled that which was practised in the United Kingdom and, to an extent, Europe, than in the United States. The "Tory" approach worked well for the party until 1917, when, as was common amongst 19th-century conservative movements, Canadian Tories opposed the rollback of government intervention in social and economic matters advocated by the liberals of the era. In contrast to "American conservative" counterparts, however, they did not undertake as dramatic an ideological turnaround in the first half of the 20th century by continuing to follow mercantilism and nascent notions of the welfare state.

Like their federal Liberal rivals, the party defined itself as a "big tent", welcoming a broad variety of members who supported relatively loosely defined goals. Unlike the Liberal Party, there was a long history of ongoing factionalism within this tent. This factionalism arose from the party's lack of electoral success, and because the party often reached out to particular political groups in order to garner enough support to topple the Liberals. These groups usually remained semi-autonomous blocs within the party, such as Quebec nationalists and western Canadian Reformers in the 1980s. In later years, observers generally grouped the PC Party's core membership into two camps, "Red Tories" and "Blue Tories".

Red Tories tend to be traditionally conservative, that is, "Tory" in the Disraelian sense in social policy, placing a high value on the principles of noblesse oblige, communitarianism, and One nation conservatism—and were thus seen as moderate (in the context of classical economic thought) in their economic policy. For most of their history they were trade protectionists, engaging in free-trade economics in only a limited fashion, as in Empire Free-Trade. Historically they comprised the largest bloc of the original Canadian Conservative party. Notable Red Tories include John Farthing, George Grant, John Diefenbaker, E. Davie Fulton, Robert Stanfield, Dufferin Roblin, Dalton Camp, W. L. Morton, William Davis, Peter Lougheed, Joe Clark and Flora MacDonald.

Blue Tories, on the other hand, were originally members of the Tory elite drawn from the commercial classes in Montreal and Toronto. Prior to World War II, they were generally conservative in social policy, and classically liberal in economic policy. From 1964 on, this cadre came to identify more with neo-liberal influences in the US Republican Party, as espoused by Barry Goldwater and Ronald Reagan, and the Thatcherite leadership in the British Conservative Party, as represented by Sir Keith Joseph and Margaret Thatcher. They have come to be termed—in the Canadian lexicon—as neoconservatives. However, there are also Blue Tories who identify strongly with the Monarchy in Canada and other traditional institutions. In Canada, Blue Tories include Ralph Klein and Mike Harris.

From 1891 until the party's dissolution, Red Tories generally dominated the highest rungs of the party and its leadership. The emerging neoconservatives of the 1970s were significantly reduced in numbers in the party by the late 1980s, and many of the disaffected drifted towards neoliberalism and parties with a neoconservative bent, such as the Reform Party of Canada. When the PC party held power at the federal level, it never truly embraced Reaganomics and its crusade against "big government" as vociferously as was done in the USA.

Canadian neoconservatives lean more towards individualism and economic liberalism. Support for the Canadian Alliance and its predecessor the Reform Party of Canada derived principally from this group, and that support carried forward into the new Conservative Party of Canada. The success of the neoconservative movement in using the label "Conservative" has brought into debate the very definition of conservatism in Canada today. Although adhering to economic philosophies similar to those originally advanced by 19th-century liberals (known confusingly as both neoliberalism and neoconservatism), the Canadian Alliance agreed to the name "Conservative Party of Canada" for the new party.

Progressive Conservative history

After a by-election defeat in 1942, a group of younger Conservatives from the Conservative Party of Canada met in Port Hope, Ontario, to develop a new Conservative policy they hoped would bring them out of the political wilderness. The participants, known as the Port Hopefuls, developed a program including many Conservative goals such as support for free enterprise and conscription. Yet the charter also included more radical policies, such as full-employment, low-cost housing, trade union rights, as well as a whole range of social security measures, including a government financed medicare system.

Although many Conservatives rejected the charter, the charter still influenced party decisions. Delegates at the convention drafted John Bracken as leader, who was not even a member of the party. Bracken supported the Port Hope Charter and insisted the party register this policy shift by changing its name to the Progressive Conservative Party.

In the early days of Canadian confederation, the party supported a mercantilist approach to economic development: export-led growth with high import barriers to protect local industry. The party was staunchly monarchist and supported playing a large role within the British Empire. It was seen by some French Canadians as supporting a policy of cultural assimilation.

The Conservative Party dominated Canadian politics for the nation's first 30 years. In general, Canada's political history has consisted of Tories alternating power with the Liberals, albeit often in minority governments supported  by smaller parties.

After a long period of Liberal dominance following the Tories ill-fated depression era mandate from 1930 to 35, John Diefenbaker won a sweeping electoral victory for the Tories in 1958. Diefenbaker was able to win most of the parliamentary seats in Western Canada, much of those in Ontario, and, with the support of the Union Nationale provincial government, a large number in Quebec. Diefenbaker attempted to pursue a policy of distancing Canada from the United States. His cabinet split over Diefenbaker's refusal of American demands that Canada accept nuclear warheads for Bomarc missiles based in North Bay, Ontario, and La Macaza, Quebec. This split contributed to the Tory government's defeat at the hands of Lester B. Pearson's Liberals in the 1963 election.

Diefenbaker remained Progressive Conservative leader until 1967, when increasing unease at his erratic behaviour, authoritarian leadership, and perceived unelectability led party president Dalton Camp to call for and win a motion for a leadership review which resulted in the 1967 leadership convention where Nova Scotia Premier Robert Stanfield was elected out of a field of eleven candidates that included Diefenbaker and Manitoba Premier Duff Roblin.

Joe Clark took the leadership of the Progressive Conservative Party in 1976. He came to power in the 1979 election, defeating the Liberal government of Pierre Trudeau and ending sixteen years of continuous Liberal rule. Taking office the day before his 40th birthday, Clark is the youngest person to become Prime Minister. His tenure was brief as he only won a minority government, and it was defeated on a motion of non-confidence pertaining to his 1979 budget. Clark's Progressive Conservative Party lost the 1980 election and Clark lost the leadership of the party  to Brian Mulroney 1983.

In the late 1960s and 1970s, following Quebec's Quiet Revolution, the Progressive Conservatives recognized the need to increase their appeal to Canada's francophone population. At the same time, the Tories moved away from economic nationalism towards a neoliberal platform. Both movements culminated with Brian Mulroney becoming prime minister after the election of 1984. He led the Tories to a record 211 seats, and a majority of seats in every province.

Mulroney had declared himself an opponent to free trade with the United States during the 1983 leadership campaign. But a growing continentalist sentiment among Canadian business leaders and the impact of the "Reagan Revolution" on Canadian conservative thought led Mulroney to embrace free trade. His government endorsed the recommendation of the 1985 Royal Commission on the Economic Union and Development Prospects for Canada that Canada pursue a free trade deal with the United States.

Traditionally, it had been the Liberal Party that held a continentalist position and the Conservatives who opposed free trade with the United States in favour of economic links with Britain. With the dissolution of the British Empire and the economic nationalism of the Liberal Party under Pierre Trudeau, the traditional positions of the two parties became reversed. It was with this background that Mulroney fought and won the 1988 election on the issue of the Canada–United States Free Trade Agreement.

Mulroney also made a promise to Quebecers, claiming that he would reform the constitution so that Quebec would be willing to endorse the Constitution, which it did not in 1982, unlike Canada's other provinces. To do this, Mulroney promised that he would give Quebec distinct society status and greater autonomy. This helped Mulroney garner substantial support from Quebec nationalists including Lucien Bouchard who joined the Conservatives claiming that providing Quebec with autonomy would be acceptable for Quebec to remain within Canada.

Although the Progressive Conservative Party switched to neoliberalism, the party did retain its social progressive policies unlike other parties which advocated neoliberalism. Mulroney and the government pursued an aggressive environmental agenda under the aide of then-environmental policy advisor, present-day Green Party leader Elizabeth May. Mulroney and members of the U.S. government sparred over action on acid rain. In the end Mulroney managed to convince U.S. President Ronald Reagan to sign an acid rain treaty, to reduce acid rain. Mulroney was recognized for his strong environmental stances recently, being named the Greenest Canadian Prime Minister by a study group.

A number of economic and governance issues contributed to the fall of the Progressive Conservative party at the federal level in the 1993 federal election:
 Canada suffered its worst recession since the Second World War,
 Unemployment rose to the highest levels since the Great Depression,
 The federal government faced high and persistent deficits, and
 The Tories had introduced a much-hated new tax, the Goods and Services Tax.
 Extensive government corruption and accusations of corruption and government mismanagement were in the news, such as the Airbus affair and evidence showing Canadian peacekeepers maltreating Somalis, which resulted in the Somalia inquiry.
 During the election campaign the Tories used an attack ad against Liberal leader Jean Chrétien, which appeared to mock his odd facial expressions—which were the result of Bell's palsy—and suggest he was unfit for the post of Prime Minister because of them.

The second major factor leading to the Mulroney government's demise was that the party's base in Quebec came from Quebec nationalists, who withdrew their support after the failure of the Meech Lake and Charlottetown Constitutional Accords. Many Quebec Tories, including a number of Members of Parliament (MPs), left the party to form the Bloc Québécois with like-minded Liberals.

The third major factor was the rise of "western alienation" in the four provinces of western Canada as a result of attempts by both Tories and Liberals to woo Quebec. Western Canadians turned their support to the Reform Party of Canada and later to its successor, the Canadian Alliance.

Following Mulroney's resignation, his successor as Tory leader and as prime minister was Kim Campbell, who led the party into the disastrous election of 1993. The Progressive Conservatives went from being the majority party to holding only two seats in the House of Commons, which was not enough to maintain official party status despite garnering 16% of the popular vote. It was the worst defeat ever suffered for a governing party at the federal level; the 151-seat loss far exceeded the 95 seats lost by the Liberals in 1984. The party's western supporters transferred virtually en masse to Reform, most of its Quebec supporters split between the sovereigntist Bloc Québécois and the Liberals, and most of its Ontario and Atlantic supporters bolted for the Liberals. Even though the Progressive Conservatives finished third in the popular vote (just percentage points behind Reform), their support was spread out across the entire country and was not concentrated in enough areas to translate into more seats. By contrast, the Bloc managed to capture Official Opposition status with 54 seats despite running candidates only in Quebec, while Reform finished third in the seat count despite being virtually nonexistent east of Manitoba.

Campbell herself was defeated, as was every member of the Cabinet except Jean Charest, whom Campbell had defeated in the election to succeed Mulroney. Campbell resigned as party leader in December, and Charest, as the only remaining member of the previous Cabinet, was quickly appointed interim leader and confirmed in the post in 1995. Charest led the party back to official party status in the 1997 election, winning 20 seats. With the exception of one seat each in Ontario and Manitoba, the rest of the seats were all in the Maritimes and Quebec. However, the PCs never won more than 20 seats again, and only two west of Quebec (not counting by-elections and switches from other parties).

Merger with Alliance
The rise of the Reform Party/Canadian Alliance was doubtless damaging to the Tories, though there remains some debate as to the precise degree. Many observers argue that from 1993 to 2003 the "conservative" vote was split between the two parties, allowing Liberal candidates to win ridings formerly considered to be Tory strongholds. This assessment led to the growth of the United Alternative movements of the late 1990s. Others insisted that a legitimate ideological gulf existed between the more ideological Alliance and the more moderate Red Tory-influenced PC Party, pointing to surveys that indicated many Tory voters would rather select the Liberals as their second choice rather than the Alliance. This seemed to be particularly born out in Ontario. The Liberals won all but one seat in that province in 1993 and 1997, and all but two in 2000—an era that was dominated by the provincial Tories. This was largely because many former bellwether ridings in suburban Toronto (known as "the 905", after its area code) turned almost solidly Liberal for most of the 1990s at the federal level while supporting the Tories at the provincial level.

Charest stepped down from the leadership in 1998 to become leader of the Quebec Liberal Party. Former leader Joe Clark returned to the post in a vote in which all party members were eligible to cast ballots, instead of a traditional leadership convention. A point system allocated each riding 100 points to be distributed among the candidates by proportional representation according to votes cast by party members in the riding. (This same system was used by the Conservative Party of Canada in 2004.) In the 2000 election Clark was able to garner the 12 seats necessary for official party status, but no more.

Clark realized that as long as the centre-right vote was divided, there was no chance of dislodging the Liberals. However, he wanted a merger on his terms. He got his chance in 2001, when several dissident Alliance MPs, the most prominent one being Alliance deputy leader and party matriarch Deborah Grey, left the Alliance caucus. The dissidents felt that Alliance leader Stockwell Day hadn't learned from mistakes made in the last election. While some of them rejoined the Alliance later, seven of them, led by Chuck Strahl of British Columbia and including Grey, refused and formed the Democratic Representative Caucus. The DRC quickly entered a coalition with the Progressive Conservatives, which lasted until 2002 when Stephen Harper ousted Day as Alliance leader. Harper wanted a closer union with the PCs, but Clark turned the offer down, and all but two of the DRC members rejoined the Alliance. One of the two, Inky Mark, eventually joined the PCs. Two by-election victories later in 2002 increased the PC caucus to 15 members and fourth place in the Commons. However, Clark was unable to gain any ground in Ontario and resigned on August 6, 2002.

On May 31, 2003, Peter MacKay won the party leadership after securing the endorsement of controversial fellow leadership candidate David Orchard, an outspoken opponent of free trade who wanted to return the party to its traditional economic nationalist roots. Orchard's endorsement of MacKay was predicated on four bullet points laid out in the Orchard-MacKay agreement, one of which expressly forbade the merger of the PC Party of Canada with the Canadian Alliance. After only a few months as party leader though, MacKay reneged on his promise and proceeded to negotiate a merger with the Alliance, which he announced had occurred on October 15, 2003. The two parties, it seemed, united to form a new party called the Conservative Party of Canada. The union was ratified on December 5 and 6 in a process conducted by each of the parties, and the new Conservative Party was formally registered on December 7. The merger prompted Clark to remark, "Some equate it to a death in the family. I regard it rather as a death of the family." On March 20, 2004, former Alliance leader Harper was elected leader of the new party and appointed MacKay as his deputy.

Rump PC caucus

House of Commons
Following the merger, a rump Progressive Conservative caucus remained in Parliament, consisting of individuals who declined to join the new Conservative Party. In the House of Commons, Joe Clark, André Bachand and John Herron sat as PC members. In the 2004 election, Bachand and Clark did not run for re-election, and Herron ran as a Liberal, losing to Rob Moore in his riding of Fundy—Royal. Scott Brison, who had joined the Liberal caucus immediately upon departing the Conservative Party, was reelected as a Liberal in the 2004 election. After being expelled from the Conservative Party caucus in June 2007, Nova Scotia MP Bill Casey designated himself as an "Independent Progressive Conservative".

Senate
In the Senate, William Doody, Lowell Murray and Norman Atkins also declined to join the new party, and continued to sit as Progressive Conservative senators. On March 24, 2005, Prime Minister Paul Martin appointed nine new senators, two of whom, Nancy Ruth and Elaine McCoy, were designated as Progressive Conservatives. Ruth subsequently left to sit with the Conservative Party. The death of Senator Doody on December 27, 2005, and the mandatory retirement of Norman Atkins on June 27, 2009, and Lowell Murray on September 26, 2011, left McCoy, the youngest of the five, as the sole Progressive Conservative in the Senate and the last sitting PC in either chamber of Parliament until February 11, 2013, when she chose to change her designation to "Independent Progressive Conservative". McCoy changed her designation to "Independent" on February 17, 2016, thus bringing to an end the presence of Progressive Conservatives in the Parliament of Canada.

Progressive Canadian Party

On January 9, 2004, a group claiming to be loyal to the Progressive Conservative Party and opposed to the merger, which they characterized as an Alliance takeover, filed application with the Chief Electoral Officer to register a party called the Progressive Conservative Party of Canada. The application was refused on the grounds that the name could no longer be utilized. The group resubmitted with the name Progressive Canadian Party, and a new "PC Party" was recognized by Elections Canada on March 26. It secured sufficient backing to be registered as an official party on May 29. It was led by former Progressive Conservative MP Joe Hueglin of Ontario.

The Progressive Canadian party aimed to be perceived as the successor party to the Progressive Conservatives. However, it did not enjoy broad support among former Progressive Conservatives. In particular, no prominent anti-merger Progressive Conservatives such as Joe Clark or David Orchard were associated with the Progressive Canadian Party, nor were any sitting MPs or senators. The most prominent members to join were two 1970s and 1980s era politicians: former cabinet minister Sinclair Stevens and former junior cabinet minister, Heward Grafftey, who polled near or below Craig Chandler in the final PC Party leadership race. It was deregistered by Elections Canada in late 2019.

Party leaders

Progressive Conservative leaders in the Senate

Party presidents

James Macdonnell (1946–1950)
George Nowlan (1950–1954)
George Hees (1954–1956)
Allister Grosart (1956–1963)
Egan Chambers (1963–1964)
Dalton Camp (1964–1969)
Frank Moores (1969–1970)
Nathan Nurgitz (1970–1971)
Donald J. Matthews (1971–1974)
Michael Meighen (1974–1977)
Robert C. Coates (1977–1978)
Peter Elzinga (1983–1986)
William H. Jarvis (1986–1989)
Gerry St. Germain (1989–1995)
Peter Van Loan (1999–2000)
Jacques Leger (2000-2001)
Bruck Easton (2001-2003)

Election results 1945–2000

See also

 Progressive Conservative leadership conventions
 Conservative Party of Canada (historical)
 Conservative Party of Canada
 Conservative parties in Canada
 List of political parties in Canada
 Politics of Canada
 Prime Ministers of Canada
 Official Opposition (Canada)

References

Further reading
 Perlin, George C. The Tory Syndrome: Leadership Politics in the Progressive Conservative Party. Montréal, Qué.: McGill-Queen's University Press, 1980. 

 
1942 establishments in Canada
2003 disestablishments in Canada
Political parties established in 1867
Political parties disestablished in 2003
Defunct political parties in Canada
Organizations based in Ottawa
Progressive conservatism